Stephen Tjephe (1 August 1955 – 16 December 2020) was a Burmese Roman Catholic bishop.

Tjephe was born in Myanmar. He served as titular bishop of Nova Barbara and auxiliary bishop, from 2009 to 2014 and bishop of the Roman Catholic Diocese of Loikaw, Myanmar, from 2015 until his death in 2020.

Notes

1955 births
2020 deaths
21st-century Roman Catholic bishops in Myanmar